Berbers in Belgium are people of Berber descent living in Belgium. Berbers in Belgium, who generally call themselves Amazigh and not Maghrebis, are estimated to number 500,000 people.

Notable people

Lubna Azabal, actress 
Lens Annab, professional football
Zakaria Bakkali, professional footballer
Laurette Onkelinx, politician from the Francophone Socialist Party

See also
Berber people
Berber Academy
Berbers in the Netherlands

References

 
Ethnic groups in Belgium
 
Muslim communities in Europe